Reuben Alvis Snake, Jr. (1937–1993) was an American Ho-Chunk (Winnebago) activist, educator, spiritual leader, and tribal leader. He served as a leader within the American Indian Movement (AIM) in the 1970s, and in the National Congress of American Indians in the 1980s. Snake worked towards the establishment of the American Indian Religious Freedom Act, which passed after his death in 1994. He advocated for the use of religious, ceremonial peyote.

Early life and education 
Reuben Alvis Snake, Jr. was born on January 12, 1937, on the Winnebago Indian Reservation in Thurston County, Nebraska. His parents were Reuben Harold and Virginia Greyhair Snake. His parents divorced and he experienced many instabilities in his childhood.

In 1950, he briefly attended the Haskell Institute (now Haskell Indian Nations University). During this time period he had struggled with alcoholism. After dropping out of college he joined the United States Army from 1956 to 1958 and was honorably discharged.

Career 
In August 1970, he participated in the Native American occupation of Mount Rushmore (i.e. "Mount Crazy Horse"). In 1972, he became the national chairman of the American Indian Movement (AIM), a civil rights organization focused on Native Americans. He worked as a leader during the Trail of Broken Treaties in 1972.

Snake served as a spiritual leader and roadman (a peyote leader) within the Native American Church starting in 1974. In 1975, Snake was appointed chairman of the Winnebago tribe. From 1985 until 1987, Snake was the president of the National Congress of American Indians. While working for the National Congress of American Indians, Snake made buttons that read, "your humble servant". He later went by the nickname, "Your Humble Serpent". Snake taught culture courses at the Institute of American Indian Arts (IAIA).

Snake had fought the overturn of Employment Division v. Smith (1990) in the Religious Freedom Restoration Act. He had organized the Native American Religious Freedom Project in order to lobby for national legislation, and the passage of 1994 amendment, American Indian Religious Freedom Act.

Death and legacy 
By the age of 40 he had already suffered from two heart attacks and diabetes. Snake died on June 28, 1993, at the age of 56.

A year after his death, the Religious Freedom Restoration Act was amended by President Bill Clinton under the name the American Indian Religious Freedom Act, which allowed for the use of peyote in religious ceremony.

He was the subject of the posthumous biography, Your Humble Serpent: The Wisdom of Reuben Snake (1995; Clear Light Books; written by Jay Fikes) and a documentary film of the same title (1996; Peacedream Productions; by film director Gary Rhine). His archive is located in the National Museum of the American Indian in Washington, D.C.

Michael Pollan wrote the book How to Change Your Mind (2018), which became a Netflix docuseries in 2022 of the same name and featured a segment on Native American use of peyote (mescaline) and mentions Snake's legal battle (season 1, episode 4).

Publications

References

External links 

 Reuben Snake papers, at the National Museum of the American Indian
 

1937 births
1993 deaths
Ho-Chunk people
Institute of American Indian Arts faculty
Native American religion
Native American activists
Native American leaders
Members of the American Indian Movement
Indigenous American traditional healers
People from Thurston County, Nebraska
United States Army soldiers